The 2015 IPC Swimming World Championships was an international swimming competition for athletes with a disability. It was held in Glasgow, United Kingdom and took place from 13 to 19 July. Around 580 athletes from around 70 countries competed at the games, with Russia topping the tables with most gold medals and medals won. The event was held at the Tollcross International Swimming Centre located within Tollcross Park in Glasgow. Initially awarded as the IPC Swimming European Championships, the event was upgraded to a World Championship after a change to the IPC calendar.

This proved to be the final event branded as the "IPC Swimming World Championships". On 30 November 2016, the IPC, which serves as the international federation for 10 disability sports, including swimming, adopted the "World Para" brand for all 10 sports. The world championship events in all of these sports were immediately rebranded as "World Para" championships. Accordingly, future IPC swimming championship events will be known as the "World Para Swimming Championships".

Venue

The Championship was staged at the Tollcross International Swimming Centre located at Tollcross, Glasgow. The venue possesses a 10 lane competition class swimming pool, and after a £13.7 million upgrade in 2013, a six lane 50 meter warm-up pool was added.

Events

Classification

Athletes are allocated a classification for each event based upon their disability to allow fairer competition between athletes of similar ability. The classifications for swimming are:
Visual impairment
S11-S13
Intellectual impairment
S14
Other disability
S1-S10 (Freestyle, backstroke and butterfly)
SB1-SB9 (breaststroke)
SM1-SM10 (individual medley)
Classifications run from S1 (severely disabled) to S10 (minimally disabled) for athletes with physical disabilities, and S11 (totally blind) to S13 (legally blind) for visually impaired athletes. Blind athletes must use blackened goggles.

Schedule

Medal table
The medal table at the end of the championship.

Multiple medallists
Many competitors won multiple medals at the 2015 Championships. The following athletes won five gold medals or more.

Records
Multiple world and continental records were broken during the competition. The below table lists the number of records broken by country.

Legend
WR: World record, CR: Championship record, AF: Africa record, AM: Americas record, AS: Asian record, EU: European record, OS: Oceania record

Footnotes
Notes

References

External links
 Official web-site

 
IPC Swimming World Championships
IPC Swimming World Championships
IPC Swimming World Championships, 2015
IPC Swimming World Championships
International sports competitions in Glasgow
World Para Swimming Championships
International aquatics competitions hosted by the United Kingdom